This article details the qualifying phase for judo at the 2024 Summer Olympics. The competition at these Games will comprise a total of 372 athletes coming from their respective NOCs; each could enter a maximum of fourteen judokas, seven each for both men and women per bodyweight category. The host country France reserves a spot in all fourteen individual events, while fifteen places are entitled to the eligible NOCs interested to have their judokas compete for Paris 2024 based on the Universality principle.

The remaining judokas must undergo a qualifying process to secure a spot in their respective weight category for the Games through the world ranking list prepared by the International Judo Federation (IJF). The qualification window commenced on 24 June 2022, and will conclude two years later (23 June 2024), with the final eligibility list published two days after the deadline.

The top 17 judokas in each bodyweight category from the world ranking list will qualify directly for the Games, ensuring that the NOC is subjected to a limit of a single judoka per division. If the NOC enters more than a single judoka ranked among the top 17 in a designated weight class, the NOC must decide which athlete obtains the quota place.

Further continental quotas (13 men and 12 women for Europe, 12 of each gender for Africa, 10 men and 11 women for the Americas, 10 of each gender for Asia, and 5 of each gender for Oceania) are also available. International Judo Federation publishes a list of all judokas for each continent across all gender-based bodyweight categories to assign these quota places according to their world ranking points. Eligible judokas with the highest number of points on the ranking list will secure a continental quota for their respective NOC at the Games regardless of their gender and weight category. Each NOC may only enter a single judoka through the continental qualification rules to certify that over a hundred different NOCs are well represented for Paris 2024.

The mixed-team tournament will offer five invitational places (one for each continent) to the highest-ranked NOCs that have qualified judokas in only five of the six mixed-team weight classes. Among these NOCs, the highest-ranked judoka vying for qualification will fill the remaining quota place to complete the team.

Timeline

Qualification summary

Men's events

Extra-lightweight (60 kg)
Provisional list. Updated to 6 February 2023.

Half-lightweight (66 kg)
Provisional list. Updated to 6 February 2023.

Lightweight (73 kg)
Provisional list. Updated to 6 February 2023.

Half-middleweight (81 kg)
Provisional list. Updated to 6 February 2023.

Middleweight (90 kg)
Provisional list. Updated to 6 February 2023.

Half-heavyweight (100 kg)
Provisional list. Updated to 6 February 2023.

Heavyweight (+100 kg)
Provisional list. Updated to 6 February 2023.

Women's events

Extra-lightweight (48 kg)
Provisional list. Updated to 6 February 2023.

Half-lightweight (52 kg)
Provisional list. Updated to 6 February 2023.

Lightweight (57 kg)
Provisional list. Updated to 6 February 2023.

Half-middleweight (63 kg)
Provisional list. Updated to 6 February 2023.

Middleweight (70 kg)
Provisional list. Updated to 6 February 2023.

Half-heavyweight (78 kg)
Provisional list. Updated to 6 February 2023.

Heavyweight (+78 kg)
Provisional list. Updated to 6 February 2023.

Continental quota allocation

Africa

Asia

Europe

Oceania

America

Returned quota reallocation

References

External links
 F.A.Q. - Judo Qualification System for Paris 2024 OG - 04.05.2022 - ENG (archived)

Qualification for the 2024 Summer Olympics
Qualification
2024
Olympics Qualification
Olympics Qualification
Olympics Qualification